The Korean Christian Federation is a Protestant body in North Korea founded in 1946. The federation is based in the capital city Pyongyang. The current secretary general is O Kyong-u. The federation has come to play an important role in international relations involving North Korea and religious organizations in South Korea and abroad.

History
The federation was founded on 28 November 1946 by Christians who had joined the ranks of the new communist administration.

Immediately, it declared that it would support the country's leader Kim Il-sung and oppose the formation of the South Korean state. Back then, the organization was led by Kim Il-sung's mother's cousin Kang Ryang-uk. Although Christians in North Korea were mostly anti-communist, about a third of them joined the Korean Christian Federation. Christian leaders who refused to join were imprisoned.

In 1972, the organization reopened Pyongyang theological college. It published Bible translations and a hymnal in 1983 and oversaw the construction of two new church buildings (via state funds) in 1988. 

Following the dissolution of the USSR, the federation has come to play an important role in international relations involving North Korea and religious organizations in South Korea and abroad, particularly in procuring international aid. For example, it has successfully called on the World Council of Churches to organize aid for North Korea. The federation has also been involved in promoting Korean reunification, including a 2014 joint north and south church service organized around themes of peace and reunification.

Organization
The federation is "under close government supervision". The federation itself restricts certain Christian activities.

Officially, the institution comprises 10,000 North Korean Christians, and acts as an inter-denominational organization by playing an important liaison role between the government and the Christians. It is one of three official Protestant bodies recognized in the country.

The federation oversees North Korea's two Protestant churches: Bongsu and Chilgol Church, in Pyongyang. It also operates the Pyongyang Theological Seminary. The current secretary general of the organization's central committee is O Kyong-u.

See also

Christianity in North Korea
Three-Self Patriotic Movement – state authorized Protestant body in China
Korea Buddhist Federation
National Council of Churches in Korea

References

External links
Korean Christian Federation documents  at the World Council of Churches
Korean Christian Federation news at North Korean Economy Watch
Korean Christian Federation at YMCA Korea 
Korean Christian Federation at Korea Computer Mission 
북 강명철목사가 조그련 수장으로 선출 at Minjok Tongshin 

Protestantism in North Korea
Religious organizations based in North Korea
1946 establishments in North Korea
Christian organizations established in 1946